Xanthorrhoea nana, commonly known as dwarf grasstree, is a species of grasstree of the genus Xanthorrhoea native to Western Australia.

Description
It blooms between August and October producing cream-white flowers.

Distribution
It has a scattered distribution the Wheatbelt and western Goldfields-Esperance regions of Western Australia where grows in sandy soils.

References

Asparagales of Australia
nana
Angiosperms of Western Australia
Plants described in 1921
Endemic flora of Southwest Australia